The ICOM IC-7100 is a multimode HF/VHF/UHF mobile amateur radio transceiver. The IC-7100 has support for a wide variety of commonly used amateur radio modes including ICOMs proprietary digital voice mode DSTAR. Additionally the radio offers 100 watts on HF, 50 watts on VHF, and 35 watts on UHF. The IC-7100 is unique in that it has a large detachable control head with a slanted display so the transmitter can be installed elsewhere in a vehicle or home. The receiver used in the IC-7100 is a triple conversion superheterodyne and has exachellet DSP and audio filters. The IC-7100 allows for connection to a computer over USB which enables the radio to be used for popular digital modes such as FT8, Winlink, and Packet Operation. Locations of nearby repeaters and sending APRS locations can be done with an optional GPS receiver attachment. Notable features that the IC-7100 lacks is an internal antenna tuner.

Specifications 
Specifications of the ICOM IC-7100:

 Frequency Range: Tx: 1.8 – 450 MHz (Amateur Bands Only) Rx: 30 kHz – 199.999 MHz and 400-470MHz
 Modes of Emission: A1A (CW), A3E (AM), J3E (LSB, USB), F3E (FM)
 Impedance: SO-239 50 Ohms, unbalanced
 Supply Voltage: 13.8 VDC External
 Current Consumption: Rx: 1.5 A Tx: 22 A
 Case Size (WxHxD): 200×83.5×82 mm; 7.9×3.3×3.2 in
 Weight (Approx.): 2.3 kg; 5.0 lb
 Output Power: 100 watts on HF, 50 watts on VHF, and 35 watts on UHF

References

External links 

 Official ICOM website
 ICOM IC-7100 website

Amateur radio transceivers